Nation Aflame is a 1937 American drama film. Directed by Victor Halperin, the film stars Noel Madison, Norma Trelvar, and Lila Lee. It was released on October 16, 1937.

Cast list
 Noel Madison as Frank Sandino, aka Sands
 Norma Trelvar as Wynne Adams
 Lila Lee as Mona Burtis
 Douglas Walton as Tommy Franklin
 Harry Holman as Roland Adams
 Arthur W. Singley as Bob Sherman
 Snub Pollard as Wolfe
 Earle Hodgins as Wilson
 Si Wills as Walker
 Roger Williams as Dave Burtis

References

External links
 
 

 

1937 drama films
1937 films
American drama films
American black-and-white films
Films directed by Victor Halperin
1930s American films